MACS 1423-z7p64 is a galaxy listed in the MAssive Cluster Survey (MACS), and announced on 10 April 2017 in the journal Nature Astronomy, as being the most distant source of reionization known at this time, with a redshift z = 7.640 ± 0.001 (lookback time >13.1 Gyr).

Discovery
MACS 1423-z7p64 was discovered through gravitational lensing by MACS J1423.8+2404 (z = 0.545), a cluster that magnified its brightness by a factor of 10. To identify the galaxy, the astronomers used the slitless grism spectrograph of the Wide Field Infrared Survey Telescope on the Hubble Space Telescope, and to determine its distance the Multi-Object Spectrometer for Infra-Red Exploration (MOSFIRE) detector of the Keck Observatory.

Nature received the paper on 27 October 2016.)

Importance
With a redshift z = 7.640 ± 0.001, and being an order of magnitude lower in intensity than the four other Lyman-α emitters currently known at z > 7.5, it is probably the most distant representative source of reionization found to date. This is from a time when the universe was around 700 million years old.

References

External links
 Nature article
 doi reference

Boötes
Galaxies
Big Bang